Epochrinopsis is a genus of the family Tephritidae, better known as fruit flies.

Species
Gymnocarena angusta Norrbom, 1992
Gymnocarena apicata (Thomas, 1914)
Gymnocarena bicolor Foote, 1960
Gymnocarena carinata Norrbom, 1992
Gymnocarena defoei Sutton & Steck, 2012
Gymnocarena diffusa (Snow, 1894)
Gymnocarena fusca Norrbom, 1992
Gymnocarena hernandezi Norrbom, 1992
Gymnocarena lichtensteinii (Wiedemann, 1830)
Gymnocarena magna Norrbom, 1992
Gymnocarena mexicana (Aczél, 1954)
Gymnocarena mississippiensis Norrbom, 1992
Gymnocarena monzoni Sutton, Steck & Norrbom, 2012
Gymnocarena norrbomi Steck & Sutton, 2012
Gymnocarena serrata Norrbom, 1992
Gymnocarena tricolor (Doane, 1899)

References

Further reading

 
 
 
 
 
 

Tephritinae
Diptera of North America